Emmanuel Philibert of Savoy, 2nd Prince of Carignano (20 August 1628 – 23 April 1709), Prince of Carignano, was the son and heir of Thomas Francis, Prince of Carignano. He constructed the Palazzo Carignano in Turin.

Biography

He was born deaf, at Moûtiers, Savoy, now part of France. His being deaf greatly concerned his family. However, he eventually learned to communicate with others by lip-reading and to speak a few words, though with great difficulty. 

As a youth, he was sent to the Spanish priest Don Manuel Ramirez, a famous teacher of the deaf in Spain. Under his guidance, Emmanuel Philibert learned to read and to write. He went on to study a range of sciences under the guidance of Alessandro Tesauro, showing great aptitude. His sister, Princess Louise Christine was the wife of Hereditary Prince Ferdinand Maximilian of Baden-Baden, they were the parents of the famous Türkenlouis, Ludwig Wilhelm of Baden-Baden.

In his 20s Emmanuel Philibert followed his father Thomas in the last of his campaigns in Lombardy, acquitting himself with great valour, and two years later he was named a colonel of cavalry in the service of his distant cousin Louis XIV, King of France. 

In 1658  Emmanuel Philibert was created a lieutenant-general by his first cousin Charles Emmanuel II, Duke of Savoy, in the latter's absence, and in 1663 was appointed governor of the city of Asti. When Charles Emmanuel died in 1675, his son and heir Victor Amadeus was only nine years old, and Emmanuel Philibert became heir presumptive to Savoy unless and until Victor Amadeus had a male heir in turn (which was not to happen until 1699).

A great connoisseur of architecture, Emmanuel Philibert commissioned the Palazzo Carignano in Turin, built between 1679 and 1684. He also commissioned major renovations to the castle of Racconigi. Guarino Guarini rebuilt an older dwelling, while the project for the park was entrusted to André le Nôtre who realised magnificent French-style gardens. 

In November 1701, he acted as Philip V of Spain in a proxy marriage between Philip V and his cousin Maria Luisa of Savoy. He also acted as godfather to Maria Luisa's sister, Princess Maria Adelaide, mother of Louis XV. 

Emmanuel Philibert died in Turin on 21 April 1709. In 1836 his remains were brought to the church of San Michele Della Chiusa in that city.

Marriage and issue

On 10 November 1684 in the Castle of Racconigi, Emmanuel Philibert, by now in his fifties, married Maria Angela Caterina d'Este, the beautiful daughter of the late General Borso d'Este, a member of the ducal family of Modena, and Ippolita d'Este, Borso's niece. This match was opposed by Louis XIV of France, who had wanted Emmanuel Philibert to marry a French princess, given his position as heir to the duchy of Savoy (Marie Thérèse de Bourbon or one of her sisters was the proposed bride, as Louis XIV had no surviving legitimate daughters).

In 1685, after the intercession of Vittorio Amadeo II, Emmanuel Philibert obtained permission from Louis XIV to return to Turin. He and Caterina had two girls and two boys, of whom only their son Vittorio Amadeo would have children. 

Maria Isabella of Savoy (14 March 1687 – 2 May 1767) married:
Alfonso Tapparello, Count of Lagnasco, no issue;
Conte Eugenio Ruffia di Cambiano, no issue; 
Cavaliere Carlo Biandrate, no issue; 
Maria Vittoria of Savoy (12 February 1688 – 18 May 1763) married Onorato Malabayla, Count of Canale in 1721, had no issue;
Victor Amadeus of Savoy, (1 Mar 1690 – 4 April 1741) married Maria Vittoria Francesca of Savoy, illegitimate daughter of Victor Amadeus II of Sardinia and his mistress Jeanne Baptiste d'Albert de Luynes, had issue;
Thomas Philippe Gaston of Savoy (10 May 1692 – 12 Sep 1715) never married;

Ancestors

References and notes

Princes of Savoy
Princes of Carignan
Deaf royalty and nobility
House of Savoy-Carignano
1628 births
1709 deaths
17th-century people from Savoy
Italian deaf people